Haukkasalo is the third largest island in Lake Päijänne in Finland, located at 61.72N 25.43E. Visitors can access Haukkasalo by cable ferry or private boat. Less than 5 people live there all year round, but there are several summer cottages.

Lake islands of Finland
Lake Päijänne